Munson Creek Falls State Natural Site is a state park in the U.S. state of Oregon, administered by the Oregon Parks and Recreation Department.  The park contains Munson Creek Falls, which is the tallest waterfall in Oregon's Coast Range.  A short hike of  leads to views of the  waterfall.

See also
 List of Oregon state parks

References

External links
 

State parks of Oregon
Parks in Tillamook County, Oregon
Waterfalls of Oregon